Mohammed Al-Sahli (born 22 May 1992) is a Saudi Arabian professional footballer who plays as a winger for Al-Khaleej.

Career
Al-Sahli began his career at the youth team of Al-Qaisumah. He was promoted to the first team in 2013. On 16 July 2019, Al-Sahli joined Saudi Professional League side Al-Raed. On 27 August 2021, Al-Sahli joined Damac. On 23 July 2022, Al-Sahli joined Al-Khaleej on a two-year deal.

References

External links
 

1992 births
Living people
Association football wingers
Saudi Arabian footballers
Saudi Arabia international footballers
Saudi Professional League players
Saudi First Division League players
Saudi Second Division players
Saudi Fourth Division players
Al-Qaisumah FC players
Al-Raed FC players
Damac FC players
Khaleej FC players
People from Eastern Province, Saudi Arabia